Yashiro is a Japanese surname and a masculine Japanese given name.

Possible writings
Yashiro can be written using different combinations of kanji characters. Here are some examples:

社, "company"
矢士呂, "arrow, knight, backbone"
矢白, "arrow, white"

The name can also be written in hiragana やしろ or katakana ヤシロ.

Yashirō or Yashirou is a separate Japanese given name, though it may be romanized the same way Yashiro. Some examples:

矢四郎, "arrow, four, son"
弥四郎, "more and more, four, son"
野四郎, "field, four, son"
夜史郎, "night, history, son"
八史朗, "eight, history, clear"
耶司郎, "question mark, administer, son"

The name can also be written in hiragana やしろう or katakana ヤシロウ.

Notable people with the given name Yashiro
 , Japanese samurai

Notable people with the surname Yashiro
 , Japanese enka singer and painter
 , Japanese composer
 , Japanese samurai
 , Japanese businessman
 , Japanese gravure idol, actress, and TV personality
Misao Yashiro (矢代 操, 1852–1891), Japanese educator, one of the founders of Meiji Law School (later Meiji University).
 , Japanese former basketball player
 Satoshi Yashiro (born 1974), former Japanese football player
 , Japanese actor and voice actor
 , Japanese shogi player
 , admiral in the Imperial Japanese Navy and Navy Minister
 , Japanese academic and art historian

Fictional characters
 Yashiro (矢代), the main character in Twittering Birds Never Fly
 Yashiro Isana (伊佐那 社), the main character in K (TV series)
 Yashiro Gaku (八代 学), the main antagonist in Boku Dake ga Inai Machi
 Yashiro Nanakase (七枷 社), a character from The King Of Fighters
 Yashiro Nene (八尋 寧々), the protagonist of Toilet-Bound Hanako-kun

See also
 Yashiro, Hyōgo
 Yashiro Station

Japanese-language surnames
Japanese masculine given names